"De Daumier-Smith's Blue Period" is a short story by J. D. Salinger, first published in the May 1952 edition of World Review (London). Declined by The New Yorker on November 14, 1951, the piece was judged too short to contain the complex religious concepts that Salinger attempted to present. It is the only work he is known to have produced in 1951 after struggling with it for over five months.

The last Salinger story to appear outside the pages of The New Yorker, it was included in his collection Nine Stories (1953).

Summary
The point of view is that of first-person narrator John Smith who, as an adult, is reassessing an episode in his life when he was nineteen. He dedicates the story to his late (fictional) stepfather.
  
The events unfold shortly after the death of Smith's mother in 1939, when he and his stepfather return to Manhattan from Paris, where the family had spent the Great Depression years. As housemates, the "exceptionally unpleasant" Smith and his "live-and-let-live" widower stepfather are incompatible developing an Alphonse and Gaston relationship.  Seeking escape, Smith applies for, and is accepted, as an instructor at a Montreal correspondence art academy, "Les Amis des Vieux Maîtres" ("Friends of the Old [Art] Masters") operated by Monsieur I. Yoshoto. Smith's résumé overstates his artistic credentials and, further, he falsely claims to be a descendant of Honoré Daumier and a confidant of Pablo Picasso. He adopts the inflated moniker "Jean de Daumier-Smith" and increasingly internalizes his own contrived persona.
  
"Les Amis des Vieux Maîtres" turns out to be Yoshoto's tiny apartment, located in Verdun, a rundown section of Montreal. Mr. Yoshoto, his wife and Smith are the only "instructors" at the correspondence art "academy". Mr. Yoshoto assigns his new employee the task of reviewing and correcting the work of three correspondence students, two of whose crude and inept artwork dismays Smith. The work of the third student, a nun, Sister Irma, intrigues and delights Smith. In his enthusiasm, he pens an officious and patronizing letter of encouragement to the woman. Smith's intervention on the sister's behalf leads to the convent banning further communications with Sister Irma, ending her enrollment at the academy. 

This rebuff stuns the young man and deepens his egotistical isolation. He summarily dismisses his four remaining students from the school, disparaging their work. To Sister Irma he writes a letter warning that her artistic talent will never flourish without proper schooling but never sends it.

In this alienated state, Smith experiences a transcendental revelation while looking into a display window of an orthopedic appliances store. In an instant, he grasps the intrinsic beauty of the prosaic objects he beholds. Smith begins to emerge from his disturbed existence. He writes a note in his diary, ceding to Sister Irma the power to pursue her destiny. He declares that "'Everyone is a nun' (tout le monde est une nonne.)" He finally reinstates his four pupils, establishing a long term relationship with them.

Analysis
"De Daumier-Smith's Blue Period" marks a shift in Salinger's fiction towards subjects that contrast religious or mystical experiences with the spiritual emptiness of American society. John Smith is described as an extremely lonely and alienated young man whose narcissism (he admits to painting seventeen self-portraits) and pretentiousness serve to insulate himself from his own suffering. The protagonist ultimately transcends his self-absorption and misanthropy through epiphanies that reveal to him the presence of God.
 
In his new job as instructor, Smith finds the artwork of two of his students, Bambi Kramer and R. Howard Ridgefield (each described with great humor by Salinger) demoralizing to the point of despondency. His third student, a devout nun from the order of the Sisters of St. Joseph, offers hope. She submits a painting depicting the burial of Christ. Astonished by her talent, Smith writes a gushing and intrusive letter to her that is as inept as the crude artistic offerings of his other pupils.
  
Commencing with this encounter between the nun and the young man, Salinger introduces the central theme in the story: intuitive understanding of life versus intellectual knowledge. This marks the beginning of the young man's advance towards self-enlightenment.

The Two Epiphanies 
After posting his letter to Sister Irma, Smith undergoes the first of his two "near-mystical experiences". Biographer Kenneth Slawenski describes the first of these episodes: 
  
 

Smith reacts to this epiphany by indulging in adolescent romantic fantasies involving Sister Irma. He clings to the illusions of his superiority.

Smith's second epiphany occurs at the same display window, but Salinger presents a tableau that includes a young woman who is rearranging the objects on display. Absorbed in dressing the display mannequin, she becomes momentarily flustered when she notices Smith observing her intently, then slips and falls. She picks herself up and resumes her humble task with dignity. The girl corresponds to Sister Irma and her simple occupation is equated with the nun's genuine dedication to God. Salinger describes the moment of the narrator's epiphany:

Slawenski regards this as the key passage in the story, revealing "the presence of God", and the emergence of Zen Buddhist topics in Salinger's writing.

Notes

Sources
 Slawenski, Kenneth. J. D. Salinger: A Life. Random House, New York 2010. .

1953 short stories
Short stories by J. D. Salinger